Orlando City SC is an American professional soccer club in Orlando, Florida, that competes as a member of the Eastern Conference in Major League Soccer (MLS). Orlando City SC began play in 2015 as the 21st franchise in MLS, succeeding the USL Pro team of the same name. In doing so they became the first MLS team in Florida since Miami Fusion and Tampa Bay Mutiny both folded following the 2001 season. The team plays in Downtown Orlando at Exploria Stadium, which it owns and operates.

History 

On October 25, 2010, Phil Rawlins and his investor group of Orlando City Soccer Club, announced their intentions of joining Major League Soccer within the next three to five years. On February 28, 2011, Orlando City announced it met with commissioner Don Garber and league officials concerning expansion. Topics covered included the demographics of the Orlando marketplace, the local corporate and fan support for soccer, and developing a roadmap for a future MLS franchise in Orlando. Orlando City team officials met with Commissioner Don Garber again on November 10, 2011, for further discussions about joining the MLS as its 20th club (which ultimately went to New York City).

On March 1, 2012, Garber visited Orlando to meet with city and county officials. He stated, "It's not a matter of if, but when", when addressing Orlando's chances of joining MLS.
On August 31, 2012, Rawlins told the Orlando Business Journal the team could get the Major League Soccer approval as early as late 2013, and be ready to play in the league by 2014 or 2015. Rawlins said to make that happen, the league had asked the team to explore building a 22,000-seat soccer-specific stadium. "They didn't say we had to have a stadium built before we could join, but they at least would like a plan that it's happening."

On November 19, 2013, Orlando City SC was announced as the league's twenty-first franchise. The team's new logo was unveiled in May 2014 and the team signed their first player to an MLS contract, former Brazil international Kaká, a month later. Kaká, who also became the team's first Designated Player after his release from A.C. Milan, was immediately loaned to São Paulo until the start of the MLS season. In the same month, Orlando City announced a partnership with Benfica. As part of that partnership, Orlando City later signed two players from Benfica U19s  – Estrela and Rafael Ramos – to MLS contracts on August 7, 2014. On November 21, 2014, head coach Adrian Heath signed a contract extension committing him to the club until the end of the 2017 MLS season. As an expansion team, Orlando had the first overall pick in the 2015 MLS SuperDraft and used it to select Canadian forward Cyle Larin.

The team hosted their first MLS game at the Citrus Bowl on March 8, 2015, against fellow expansion team New York City FC, in front of a crowd of 62,510. Kaká scored in stoppage time to earn a 1–1 draw. In the following game, they defeated Houston Dynamo 1–0 on the road to earn their first victory. On March 21, Orlando conceded a late stoppage time goal to Octavio Rivero of Vancouver Whitecaps for their first defeat. In their inaugural season Orlando City finished 7th in the Eastern Conference and 14th in the overall standings, falling short of the playoffs by one point. Larin scored 17 goals across the season, breaking Damani Ralph's record of 13 as a rookie and earned the MLS Rookie of the Year Award.

Midway through the 2016 season, following disappointing results and performance of the team,  head coach Adrian Heath was fired in July 2016. He was replaced by Jason Kreis. However, the Lions ended the season missing the playoffs once again.

In 2017, the Lions moved to the purpose-built Orlando City Stadium. With the team again struggling, they attempted to improve during the summer transfer window by acquiring Sporting Kansas City striker Dom Dwyer who had played for Orlando City's USL Pro team on-loan in 2013, notably scoring four goals in the USL Pro Championship Final. The club traded incentives totaling to $1.6 million, a record trade between two MLS clubs at the time. The team again failed to reach the postseason. Kaká announced that he would not return for Orlando City and soon after confirmed his retirement.

Fifteen games into the 2018 season, Orlando City released head coach Jason Kreis after nearly two seasons. Two weeks later, USL club Louisville City FC announced head coach James O'Connor, a former defender and assistant coach of the original Orlando City franchise, was to become Kreis's replacement. However, O'Connor only managed two wins in his 18 games in charge in 2018 as City missed the playoffs for the fourth consecutive season and also set a new MLS record with 74 goals conceded on the year. O'Connor was fired at the end of the 2019 season with the team missing out on playoffs again and remaining 11th in the Eastern Conference.

Ahead of the 2020 season, Orlando hired former Colorado Rapids and FC Dallas head coach Óscar Pareja. With the season disrupted due to the COVID-19 pandemic, Orlando competed in the MLS is Back Tournament held at the ESPN Wide World of Sports Complex in July and August. The Lions reached the final, eventually losing to the Portland Timbers 2–1. MLS resumed the regular season on August 12. After failing to make the postseason the previous five years, Orlando snapped the joint second-longest MLS playoff drought in history under the guidance of Pareja. The Lions reached the conference semi-finals, eliminating New York City FC in a dramatic penalty shootout in the first round before losing to New England Revolution.

On May 12, 2021, Orlando City majority owner Flavio Augusto da Silva announced he was in advanced negotiations with Zygi and Mark Wilf, owners of the Minnesota Vikings of the NFL, for the sale of the club including the Orlando Pride, Exploria Stadium and other related soccer assets. The combined value of the deal was estimated at $400–450 million. The sale was officially completed on July 21, 2021.

On September 7, 2022, Orlando City won their first trophy as an MLS team, beating USL Championship side Sacramento Republic 3–0 in the 2022 U.S. Open Cup Final.

Orlando debuted in the CONCACAF Champions League in 2023, qualifying as U.S. Open Cup winners. The team's first opponent was Tigres UNAL in the round of 16. The Lions were eliminated by Tigres on the away goals rule after a 1–1 tie on aggregate.

Stadium 

In April 2013, the City of Orlando purchased downtown land for $8.2 million to be used towards the construction of a $110 million MLS soccer stadium. However, in May, the Florida House of Representatives failed to vote on a bill that had passed the Senate that would have provided up to $30 million in state funds towards the stadium project. Phil Rawlins responded by expressing his intent to find alternative funding and keep seeking MLS expansion. The mechanism to allow for the sales tax rebate for the MLS team was ultimately passed on April 25, 2014.

The Orlando downtown soccer stadium moved closer to securing funding on August 8, 2013, when Orange County Mayor Teresa Jacobs and Orlando Mayor Buddy Dyer reached an agreement on a deal to provide financial support for a variety of Orlando projects including the new MLS soccer stadium. The last piece in stadium funding was an October 2013 vote on using an existing tourism tax to fund the final quarter of the $80 million stadium project. On October 22, 2013, the Orange County Board of Commissioners voted 5–2 to approve the use of $20 million in tourist development tax funds to build an $84 million multi-purpose soccer stadium in downtown Orlando.

On May 29, 2015, after two years trying to get funding from the state of Florida, Flávio Augusto da Silva announced that the stadium would be privately funded in its entirety and would be owned and operated by the club. He also announced plans to increase capacity to between 25,000 and 28,000 and that the club would buy the initial location from the City of Orlando.

On March 5, 2017, Orlando City hosted New York City FC in the stadium's inaugural match to begin the 2017 season. Cyle Larin scored the first goal in stadium history as Orlando City won 1–0 in front of a sellout crowd of 25,550.

In 2017, Exploria Stadium became the first venue to host an MLS, NWSL, and USL team all in the same location.

The stadium has also played host to several nationally relevant matches. On October 6, 2017, the stadium hosted the United States men's national team for the first time in a 2018 FIFA World Cup qualifier against Panama. The following week the 2017 NWSL Championship game between North Carolina Courage and Portland Thorns was also played there. The United States women's national team made its stadium debut during the 2018 SheBelieves Cup.

On June 4, 2019, the naming rights to the stadium were sold to Florida-based time share and vacation rental company Exploria Resorts. As a result, the stadium was renamed Exploria Stadium.

On July 31, 2019, the stadium hosted the 2019 MLS All-Star Game between Atlético Madrid and the MLS All-Stars, which Atlético won 3–0.

Camping World Stadium 

Prior to the completion of Orlando City's soccer specific stadium, the Lions occupied the then-named Citrus Bowl for their first two seasons in Major League soccer, which the team had also invested in for renovations. In the opening home matches of the 2015 and 2016 seasons, Orlando City ran their "fill the bowl" campaign, which led to sell-out crowds of over 60,000. Orlando City averaged over 30,000 in attendance while using the stadium.

Developmental system 

Like most MLS teams, Orlando has a reserve affiliate by way of Orlando City B, which is based at Osceola County Stadium and currently competes in MLS Next Pro. Originally, after MLS dissolved its reserve league in 2014, Orlando City had an affiliation agreement with Louisville City FC, the club that bought the USL license from the owners of the Orlando City. The agreement provided that Orlando City will loan at least four players to Louisville City during the season. In 2016, Orlando City ended their affiliation with Louisville and began its own USL expansion franchise, Orlando City B, which originally played at Titan Soccer Complex. The team played two seasons in USL before going on hiatus in 2018. The team returned in 2019 following a league restructure and became a founding member of USL League One, the third tier of the US Soccer pyramid, contesting two seasons and finishing in last place both years before going on hiatus again with a view to joining a potential relaunched MLS reserve league in the future. In OCB's absence in 2021, Orlando City resurrected their under-23 team to play in the developmental United Premier Soccer League. Following the decision by MLS to resurrect the reserve league system, it was announced that Orlando City B was returning in 2022 for the inaugural MLS Next Pro season.

In 2010, the founding year of Orlando City's original USL franchise, the team allied with Central Florida Kraze of the Premier Development League to assist player development. Following their successful first season, Orlando City acquired a controlling interest in the Kraze and renamed them Orlando City U-23. The team has a legacy that includes several current and past MLS players, and won the PDL Championship in 2004. In lieu of OCB's creation, the U-23 team was folded after the 2015 season.

After their 2011 season, Orlando City also acquired controlling interest in the Florida Soccer Alliance youth soccer club, renaming them Orlando City Youth Soccer Club. The club is now a member of the Elite Club National League (ECNL) and has several boys and girls teams competing at local, state and national level with age groups ranging from 8 to 18.

Facilities 
In May 2019, the team announced plans to move all of Orlando City's development pyramid to one single shared facility, creating a  training complex at Osceola Heritage Park to house the senior MLS team, OCB and Development Academy. Osceola County Stadium was converted into a soccer-specific stadium and acts as the home stadium of OCB. It was a vision first set out by the club's executive vice president of soccer operations, Luiz Muzzi, upon his appointment in December 2018 as a means of solidifying the in-house pipeline from youth to professional. The facility was officially opened on January 17, 2020.

Colors and badge 
The logo for Orlando City's expansion team was unveiled in 2014. The main aspects, including the purple color scheme and lion ident, carried over from the logo of the USL Pro team. New features and changes were introduced to represent the transition of the franchise into a first division team. The logo consists of a gold Lion face with 21 sun flares making up its mane sitting within a purple shield. The number of flares represents the club's position as the twenty-first team in MLS, while the sun-shaped mane is in reference to Florida's nickname as The Sunshine State. The team name is also seen in the crest in white.

Uniform evolution 
 Home

 Away

Sponsorship 

Orlando Health has been the official shirt sponsor for Orlando City SC since the team's inception as a USL franchise in 2010. In 2013, Orlando Health extended its partnership with the club, becoming the first jersey partner in MLS history to commit to an expansion club prior to its admittance to the league. Adidas also signed on as the club's kit provider for the 2015 season as per the league-wide deal made by MLS. The deal means that there are no longer third kits and only one kit (between the home and away) is permitted to change per season, rotating on an annual basis.

Mascot
Orlando City's mascot is Kingston, an anthropomorphized and "bulked up" lion complete with dreadlocks.

Club culture

Supporters
The club had sold over 13,000 season tickets before playing its first match in March 2015, selling all 14,000 available season tickets later that month. As of the 2017 season, Orlando City's season ticket base stands at a cap of 18,000. On March 8, 2015, 62,510 people were in attendance for Orlando's home opener versus New York City FC, a record of any expansion team, and finished the year with the second-highest average attendance figures behind only Seattle Sounders FC, again setting a new record for an expansion team.

The club has two major active supporters groups, which combine forces on game days to create "The Wall" now housed in the safe standing section: The Ruckus and The Iron Lion Firm. The Ruckus is the oldest of these groups founded in 2010, original formed in 2009 as the "Orlando Soccer Supporters Club" without an affiliation to any particular soccer team. The Iron Lion Firm separated from The Ruckus prior to the start of City's first season.

The club also has officially recognized international fan clubs in both Brazil and the United Kingdom.

Rivalries
Orlando City does not compete for any official MLS rivalry trophy.

The club has an interstate rivalry with Inter Miami CF, currently the team's closest neighbors and only other Florida-based team in MLS. Orlando City joined MLS in 2015 but had to wait until its sixth season to play a first interstate match against an MLS opponent following the introduction of Inter Miami as an expansion franchise in 2020. Unlike a lot of rivalries in Major League Soccer, there is no name for this series although several have been mooted to little to no success. Prior to the creation of Inter Miami, Orlando City had established a geographical rivalry with Atlanta United FC as the only two MLS clubs in the southeastern region of the United States when Atlanta joined MLS in 2017. From the beginning, the series has seen several fan incidents as well as player and front office animosity including both teams banning the others' supporters groups.

Before Orlando City had obvious geographical rivalries, there were several competitive rivalries that formed, particularly with regular Eastern Conference opponents. New York City FC was considered an immediate de facto rival by virtue of being a fellow 2015 expansion franchise although it was felt to a lesser degree by New York City as they already had multiple close geographical rivals. Nevertheless, the two teams made their MLS debut against each other with 10-man Orlando rescuing a dramatic 1–1 draw in stoppage time, and used each other as a bench mark in that first campaign. Tensions peaked when the two teams met in the 2020 MLS Cup Playoffs, a chaotic game that saw NYCFC's season end in farcical fashion and re-established Orlando's status as a rival in the eyes of New York City fans. Some of Orlando City's most intense and controversial moments in the inaugural season occurred against Columbus Crew, leaving Orlando fans feeling aggrieved and sowed the seeds for a potential minor rivalry although more uneventful subsequent meetings quelled these early sentiments.

Players

Roster

Staff

Honors
U.S. Open Cup
Champions (1): 2022

Team records

List of seasons 
This is a complete list of seasons for the MLS franchise. For a season-by-season history including the preceding Orlando City SC (2010–2014) USL franchise, see list of Orlando City SC seasons.

Source

Head coaches 
 Only competitive games counted. Includes MLS regular season, MLS playoffs, MLS is Back Tournament, and U.S. Open Cup.

Club captains

Affiliated clubs 
Orlando City SC ownership
 Orlando Pride (NWSL)
 Orlando City B (MLS Next Pro)

Technical partnerships
  Club Athletico Paranaense
  S.L. Benfica
  Stoke City F.C.
  VfL Wolfsburg

See also 
 Expansion of Major League Soccer

References

External links 
 

 
Association football clubs established in 2013
Soccer clubs in Orlando, Florida
2013 establishments in Florida
Major League Soccer teams
2021 mergers and acquisitions